Aluterus is a genus of filefishes.

Species
There are currently 4 recognized species in this genus:
 Aluterus heudelotii Hollard, 1855 (Dotterel filefish)
 Aluterus monoceros Linnaeus, 1758 (Unicorn leatherjacket filefish)
 Aluterus schoepfii Walbaum, 1792 (Orange filefish)
 Aluterus scriptus Osbeck, 1765 (Scribbled leatherjacket filefish)

References

Monacanthidae
Marine fish genera
Taxa named by Hippolyte Cloquet